Cynthia Akanga is a Togolese-French dancer, choreographer, artistic director and director of live shows. In 1998 she appeared in the musical "Notre-Dame de Paris". Since 18 April 2014 she has appeared on the second season of the show The Best, broadcast on TF1, presented by Estelle Denis and Christophe Beaugrand.

References

Togolese entertainers
French female dancers
French women choreographers
Living people
Year of birth missing (living people)
21st-century Togolese people